Sergey Petukhov may refer to:

 Sergei Petukhov (choreographer), Russian choreographer mostly working with figure skaters, including Ilia Tkachenko
 Sergei Igorevich Petukhov (b. 1984), Russian footballer
 Sergey Petukhov (sprinter) Russian athlete.